5A may refer to :

 AAAAA Tourist Attractions of China (5A), tourist attractions in the highest official rating category in the People's Republic of China
 Alpine Air Express IATA airline designator
 Vermont Route 5A
 New York State Route 5A
 British Columbia Highway 5A
 Florida State Road 5A
 GCR Class 5A, a class of British 0-6-0T steam locomotive
 5A (drum stick), the most general purpose stick
 RTS-5A, a former South Australian television station (now WIN SA)
 Libya (aircraft registration prefix 5A)
5A, the production code for the 1978 Doctor Who serial The Ribos Operation

See also
A5 (disambiguation)